Widad amal madinet Laghouat is an Algerian football club based in Laghouat, Laghouat Province. The club currently plays in the Ligue Régionale de football de Ouargla of the Ligue Régional I.

References

Football clubs in Algeria
Laghouat Province
Sports clubs in Algeria